Danny Rivera / Alborada is an album by Danny Rivera and the group Alborada (from Puerto Rico) which has been categorized by critics as one of the best albums by Danny Rivera. This album was dedicated to Puerto Rican composer Manuel Jiménez "El Canario" who died in 1975.

Album name
At first it seems like Alborada is the name of an album by Danny Rivera, but in reality it is a self-titled album.

The original agreement between Danny and Alborada was to have the album titled Danny Rivera y Alborada (Danny Rivera and Alborada) but at the last minute the record company decided to get rid of the "y" ("and"). The CD version has the name "Alborada" in a smaller font than "Danny Rivera" contributing even more to this misconception.

Track listing

Musicians

Danny Rivera - lead vocals
 Eladio Torres - guitar and lead vocals on "Huracán" 
 Carlos Bedoya - cuatro
 Heriberto González Sánchez - guitar and lead vocals on "Huracán"
 Minerva Aponte - lead vocals
 Roberto Figueroa - guitar and lead vocals on "Huracán"
 Frank Lovato - guitar (uncredited on album)
 Tony Fornaris - congas, bongó and percussion
 Wiso Velez - bass
 Deano Navarro - drums
 Pablo Nieves - percussion

Production details

Album art

The album art was created by guitarist, singer and composer of Alborada, Heriberto González.

Error

In Huracán (at 1:24), Danny gets confused when introducing the next singer Heriberto González saying "Rob... Heriberto digo..." ("Rob... I mean, Heriberto"). For some reason this was not corrected.

References

1976 albums
Danny Rivera albums